Pop Crimes is a 2009 solo album by Australian musician Rowland S. Howard. The album was released on 16 October 2009, ten years after Howard's previous solo album Teenage Snuff Film, and  months before his death from liver cancer on 30 December. The album was released in the United States by Fat Possum Records in August 2014. Remastered versions of both Howard's solo albums were released by Mute Records in Europe, Fat Possum in America and Bloodlines in Australia on 27 March 2020.

Track listing
All songs composed by Rowland S. Howard; except where indicated

Personnel
Rowland S. Howard – vocals and guitar
Mick Harvey – drums and organ
J.P. Shilo – guitar, violin, "general strangeness" and bass guitar (except 1,5,8)
with:
Brian Hooper – bass guitar (6,8)
Sean Stewart – bass guitar (1)
Jonnine Standish – vocals (1)
Technical
Ken Taylor - artwork, design
Karl Scullin - cover photography

References

2009 albums
Rowland S. Howard albums
Fat Possum Records albums